"Whenever You Call" is a song by the J-pop boy band Arashi, released as a digital single on September 18, 2020. Written and produced by Bruno Mars and D'Mile, the song is the group's first release with lyrics completely in English. The song was downloaded almost 59 thousand times within its first three days of release to reach the top spot in digital downloads and No. 6 on the Billboard Japan Hot 100.

Personnel 
Credits adapted from This is Arashi album liner notes: 

 Bruno Mars - writer, producer
 D'Mile - writer, producer
 Serban Ghenea - mixing engineer 
 John Hanes - engineer [for mix]
 Randy Merrill - mastering engineer

Charts

References

External links 
 Official release web page
 Official music video

2020 singles 
2020 songs
Arashi songs
J Storm singles
English-language Japanese songs
Songs written by Bruno Mars
Songs written by D'Mile